Bryn Hall may refer to:
 Bryn Hall, Ashton-in-Makerfield, a house in Bryn Park, Ashton-in-Makerfield, Greater Manchester
 Bryn Hall (rugby union), New Zealand rugby union player